Quispicanchi Province is one of thirteen provinces in the Cusco Region in the southern highlands of Peru.

Geography 
The Quispicanchi Province is bounded to the north by the Paucartambo Province and the Madre de Dios Region, to the east by the Puno Region, to the south by the Canchis Province, and to the west by the Acomayo Province, the Paruro Province and the Cusco Province.

The Willkanuta mountain range traverses the province. Some of the highest peaks of the province are Ausangate, Chumpi and Qullpa Ananta. Other mountains are listed below:

Siwinaqucha and Sinkrinaqucha belong to the largest lakes of the province.

Political division
The province is divided into twelve districts, each of which is headed by a mayor (alcalde). The districts, with their capitals in parenthesis, are:

 Andahuaylillas (Andahuaylillas)
 Camanti (Quince Mil)
 Ccarhuayo (Ccarhuayo)
 Ccatca (Ccatca)
 Cusipata (Cusipata)
 Huaro (Huaro)
 Lucre (Lucre)
 Marcapata (Marcapata)
 Ocongate (Ocongate)
 Oropesa (Oropesa)
 Quiquijana (Quiquijana)
 Urcos (Urcos)

Ethnic groups 
The people in the province are mainly indigenous citizens of Quechua descent. Quechua is the language which the majority of the population (75.35%) learnt to speak in childhood, 24.29% of the residents started speaking using the Spanish language (2007 Peru Census).

See also 
 Armaqucha
 Chuqi Pukyu
 Pachamama Raymi
 Pikillaqta
 Quyllur Urmana
 Q'umirqucha (Camanti)
 Q'umirqucha (Q'umir Qucha)
 Q'umirqucha (Yanaq Qusqu K'uchu)
 Pukaqucha
 Rumiqullqa 
 T'anta Raymi
 Warurumiqucha

Sources 

Provinces of the Cusco Region